{{Infobox football club
| clubname    = Beni Ebeid SC
| image       = 
| fullname    = Beni Ebeid Sporting Clubنادي بني عبيد الرياضي
| nickname    =
| short name  = BEB
| founded     = 
| ground      = Beni Ebeid Stadium
| capacity    = 
| chairman    = Metwali Radwan
| manager     = Adel Sedik
| league      = Egyptian Second Division
| season      = 2016–17
| position    = Third Division, 1st (Group G)(Promoted)
| website     = 
}}Beni Ebeid Sporting Club''', is an Egyptian football club based in Beni Ebeid, Egypt. The club currently plays in the Egyptian Second Division, the second-highest league in the Egyptian football league system.

The club is known for eliminating Cairo giants Zamalek from the 2008–09 Egypt Cup Round of 32.

References

Egyptian Second Division
Football clubs in Egypt